Safiye is a Turkish feminine given name, a variant of the Arabic name Safiya. People named Safiye include:

 Safiye Ali (1891–1952), Turkish physician
 Safiye Ayla (1907–1998), Turkish singer
 Safiye Erol (1902–1964), Turkish novelist
 Safiye Sultan (wife of Murad III) (1550–1619), the spouse of Ottoman sultan Murad III and the mother of Sultan Mehmed III
 Safiye Sultan (daughter of Mustafa II) (1696–1778), the daughter of Ottoman sultan Mustafa II

Turkish feminine given names